Senator Bischoff may refer to:

Bob Bischoff (born 1941), Indiana State Senate
Douglas Bischoff (1936–1991), Utah State Senate